Commentator or commentators may refer to:
 Commentator (historical) or Postglossator, a member of a European legal school that arose in France in the fourteenth century 
 Commentator (horse) (foaled 2001), American Thoroughbred racehorse
 The Commentator or Ibn Rushd or Averroes (1126–1198), Andalusian philosopher
"The Commentators", a 1985 single by Rory Bremner
Oregon Commentator, formerly a student publication at the University of Oregon
 Political commentator or pundit
 Sports commentator or sportscaster
 The Commentator, a political website published by Robin Shepherd
 The Commentator, formerly a student publication at Texas A&M University

See also
 Color commentator, someone who assists the play-by-play commentator
 Commentary (disambiguation)
 Internet commentator (disambiguation)